The UST Angelicum College is a private Catholic basic and higher education institution run by the Philippine Dominican Province of the Order of Preachers located in Quezon City, Metro Manila, Philippines. It was founded in July 1972 by the Dominican priest Rev. Fr. Rogelio B. Alarcon, OP who became its first rector. UST Angelicum is an official member of the Dominican Network. It attained Level II Primary Accreditation conducted by PAASCU

Integration with University of Santo Tomas

In academic year 2018-19, Angelicum College was renamed University of Santo Tomas – Angelicum College as per a memorandum of agreement signed on June 29, 2017. The renaming was part of plans to oversee and integrate with other Dominican educational institutions in the Philippines.

The existing Board of Trustees of Angelicum was dissolved and a new one was formed composed of 12 members, 9 from UST Manila and 3 from Angelicum College but retained its independence in handling its own administrative and financial affairs. UST Rector Fr. Herminio Dagohoy, O.P. became Chief Executive Officer and College Rector while former Angelicum College Rector Fr. Ferdinand Bautista, O.P. became Chief Operating Officer. As part of the integration process, Rev. Fr. Herminio Dagohoy, O.P. planned to implement new policies and programs to improve Angelicum College's approach to education.

Notable alumni
Sarah Christophers, actress
Dianne dela Fuente, actress and singer
Sarah Geronimo, singer, actress, television personality, and record producer
Nicole Kim Donesa, actress, singer, and beauty queen
Yasmien Kurdi, singer-songwriter, actor, and commercial model
Derrick Monasterio, actor and singer
Kurt Perez, child actor
Julie Anne San Jose, singer, songwriter, actress, and television personality
Empress Schuck, actress
Bernadette Sembrano, reporter, newscaster, and television host
Antonio Trillanes, politician
Lauren Young, actress and model

See also
 University of Santo Tomas
 University of Santo Tomas - Legazpi

References

External links
Angelicum School official website

Universities and colleges in Quezon City
Catholic universities and colleges in Metro Manila
Dominican educational institutions in the Philippines
Liberal arts colleges in the Philippines
Educational institutions established in 1972
1972 establishments in the Philippines